Keki Bezon Tarapore  (11 October 1922 – 12 July 2001), was an Indian cricketer and coach. He coached a number of cricketing greats including Rahul Dravid and Anil Kumble.

References

1922 births
2001 deaths
Indian cricket coaches
Parsi people